Caitlyn Bairstow is a Canadian voice actress in Vancouver, British Columbia.

She is known for her voice roles of Suna in Mega Man: Fully Charged, Glitch in Spy Kids: Mission Critical, Lucky in Super Lucky's Tale and Blue Bobbin in My Little Pony: Friendship is Magic.

Filmography

Animation

Film

Video games

Voice Directing

References

External links

Living people
Canadian voice actresses
Year of birth missing (living people)